Tim Mullen is an American rock drummer. He was the member of the well known metal band- Himsa from 2000 to 2003. Mullen joined the Seattle punk rock band, Sledgeback in the year 2009.

Musical career
Tim Mullen was a member of Seattle heavy metal outfit, Himsa. He accomplished several US and European tours as member of the band, supporting acts like Lamb of God, Avenged Sevenfold, AFI and Hatebreed. Tim Mullen departed Himsa in 2004 and has not played in a notable project until February 2009, when he joined Sledgeback.

Equipment
Tim Mullen uses Gretsch Drums, Zildjian Cymbals, Tama Hardware, Remo Heads, and Promark Sticks.

Discography
 Death Is Infinite – Himsa (2001)
 Courting Tragedy and Disaster – Himsa (2003)
 Reality bites – Sledgeback (2010)
 Bite the bullet – Sledgeback (2010), Sledgeback (album) 3 of a kind (2011), Sledgeback (album) 7 years like a broken record (2011)

References

External links 
Sledgeback, includes information on the band with a brief mention of Mullen
Totalrock In Sledgeback interview including some photographs
III Muszak Magazine In this interview with Gabor Hun (Page 6 / PDF)

American punk rock drummers
American male drummers
American drummers
Musicians from Washington (state)
1975 births
Living people
21st-century American drummers
21st-century American male musicians